Wil railway station is a railway station in Wil, in the Swiss canton of St. Gallen. It sits at the junction of three standard-gauge railway lines: Wil–Kreuzlingen, St. Gallen–Winterthur, and Wil–Ebnat-Kappel. In addition, the  Frauenfeld–Wil line terminates across the street.

Services 
 the following services stop at Wil:

 St. Gallen S-Bahn:
 : half-hourly service over the Wil–Ebnat-Kappel line to Wattwil.
 : half-hourly service over the Wil–Kreuzlingen line to Weinfelden and Romanshorn.
 : half-hourly service over the metre-gauge Frauenfeld–Wil line to Frauenfeld.
 Zürich S-Bahn:
 /: half-hourly service over the St. Gallen–Winterthur line to Winterthur and points west, supplementing the long-distance services.

References

External links 
 
 

Railway stations in the canton of St. Gallen
Swiss Federal Railways stations
Wil